Path of Wellness is the tenth studio album by the American rock band Sleater-Kinney. The album was released on June 11, 2021 by Mom + Pop Music.

Background 
Following a nine-year hiatus, the American punk rock band Sleater-Kinney announced their return with the track "Bury Our Friends" on October 19, 2014. On January 20, 2015, they released No Cities to Love via Sub Pop Records, the first Sleater-Kinney album since 2005's The Woods. Three years later, singer and guitarist Carrie Brownstein told Pitchfork that Sleater-Kinney was working on a follow-up effort to No Cities To Love, but that they were "going to do this very slowly". In January 2019, Brownstein confirmed to NPR that the album was produced by St. Vincent and would be released later in the year.

On July 1, 2019, drummer Janet Weiss announced over Instagram that she was leaving Sleater-Kinney, saying, "The band is heading in a new direction and it is time for me to move on." Sleater-Kinney's ninth studio album, The Center Won't Hold, was released a month and a half later, on August 16. There was some speculation among fans that Weiss had left Sleater-Kinney due to St. Vincent's involvement in the new record, which Brownstein denied, saying that it was originally Weiss's idea to work with her. Responding to a fan on Instagram, Brownstein added, "She left. We asked her to stay. We tried. It's hard and sad." When Sleater-Kinney went on tour that September to promote The Center Won't Hold, they recruited Angie Boylan of Aye Nako as their touring drummer. That November, Weiss appeared on the Trap Set With Joe Wong podcast, saying that she had left Sleater-Kinney because the "roles changed within the band", and that she was "just the drummer now" as opposed to "a creative equal" with Tucker and Brownstein.

Release and promotion 
On May 11, 2021, Sleater-Kinney announced the album title, cover art, and release date for Path of Wellness, and promised their fans "so much more, soon". Accompanying the album announcement was the release of Path of Wellnesss lead single and music video, "Worry With You". The video, directed by Alberta Poon, features a young couple, played by Fabi Reyna and Megan Watson, attempting to cohabitate in their undersized house. Tucker and Brownstein make cameo appearances as an actor in a pharmaceutical commercial and as a television fitness instructor, respectively. On May 26, the band released their follow-up single and video to "Worry With You", titled "High in the Grass". Directed by Kelly Sears, the video for "High in the Grass" provides a psychedelic element, with trees with eyes and a number of decapitated figures, both dancing and attempting cardiopulmonary resuscitation, before culminating in a dance party. The final single to be released in advance of Path of Wellness was "Method", which came out on June 9. The song was accompanied by a Lance Bangs-directed lyric video.

To accompany the June 11 release of Path of Wellness, Sleater-Kinney announced a variety show-style livestream on Amazon Music's Twitch channel, beginning at 9p.m. (ET) on June 10. Hosted by Chris Hewett, the livestream featured "interviews, live performances and a fortune teller weighing in on [the band's] future prospects", as well as a variety of guest appearances from celebrities and musicians such as Nick Offerman, Megan Mullally, and Matt Berninger from the National. On June 25, Sleater-Kinney released a live extended play titled Live At The Hallowed Halls, featuring recordings of the four tracks on Path of Wellness that they played during the livestream event. Sleater-Kinney promoted Path of Wellness with two other live and recorded events. On June 16, Sleater-Kinney appeared on The Late Show with Stephen Colbert to perform "Worry With You". Rather than playing in front of a live studio audience, the band submitted a pre-taped performance from an abandoned skate park. The next day, Tucker and Brownstein appeared on the Audible service Words + Music to discuss "30 years of shared history making music and making noise".

Critical reception

Path of Wellness was met with mostly positive reviews from music critics. At Metacritic, which assigns a normalized rating out of 100 to reviews from mainstream critics, Path of Wellness has an average score of 78 based on 18 reviews. The review aggregator AnyDecentMusic? gave the album 7.1 out of 10, based on their assessment of the critical consensus.

Track listing

Charts

References

2021 albums
Sleater-Kinney albums
Mom + Pop Music albums